The protected areas of the Sierra Nevada, a major mountain range located in the U.S. states of California and Nevada, are numerous and highly diverse. Like the mountain range itself, these areas span hundreds of miles along the length of the range, and over 14,000 feet of elevation from the lowest foothills to the summit of Mount Whitney.

The Sierra Nevada, as a natural region, does not have exactly defined borders. In particular, to the north, there is a wide transition zone where the Cascade Range and the Sierra Nevada meet. As a result, it is difficult to delineate a border between these two mountain ranges. This list uses the common definition of the Sierra Nevada as the mountain range extending from Fredonyer Pass in the north to Tehachapi Pass in the south. It is also difficult to delineate between the Sierra Nevada mountains, the range's foothills, and the Central Valley; this article also considers any elevated and hilly terrain east of the flat Central Valley to be part of the range. Areas outside those bounds may also be included if they are widely associated with the Sierra Nevada.

National parks and monuments

National forests

Wilderness areas

Other federal protected areas
 Blue Ridge National Wildlife Refuge
 Jawbone–Butterbredt Area of Critical Environmental Concern
 The Red Hills of Tuolumne County Area of Critical Environmental Concern

State parks
 Burton Creek State Park
 Calaveras Big Trees State Park
 D. L. Bliss State Park
 Donner Memorial State Park
 Ed Z'berg Sugar Pine Point State Park
 Emerald Bay State Park
 Grover Hot Springs State Park
 Lake Tahoe–Nevada State Park (Nevada)
 Plumas-Eureka State Park
 South Yuba River State Park
 Van Sickle Bi-State Park (co-managed by California and Nevada)
 Washoe Meadows State Park

State recreation areas
 Auburn State Recreation Area
 Folsom Lake State Recreation Area
 Kings Beach State Recreation Area
 Lake Oroville State Recreation Area
 Lake Valley State Recreation Area
 Millerton Lake State Recreation Area
 Tahoe State Recreation Area

State forests
 Mount Zion Demonstration State Forest
 Mountain Home Demonstration State Forest

State historic parks
 Columbia State Historic Park
 Empire Mine State Historic Park
 Indian Grinding Rock State Historic Park
 Malakoff Diggins State Historic Park
 Marshall Gold Discovery State Historic Park
 Railtown 1897 State Historic Park
 Wassama Round House State Historic Park

See also
 Protected areas of California
 Protected areas of the United States

Notes

References

Sierra Nevada
Sierra Nevada
Sierra Nevada (United States)-related lists
Sierra Nevada